BACE1-AS, also known as BACE1 antisense RNA (non-protein coding), is a human gene at 11q23.3 encoding a long noncoding RNA molecule. It is transcribed from the opposite strand to BACE1 and is upregulated in patients with Alzheimer's disease. BACE1-AS regulates the expression of BACE1 by increasing BACE1 mRNA stability and generating additional BACE1 through a post-transcriptional feed-forward mechanism. By the same mechanism it also raises concentrations of beta amyloid, the main constituent of senile plaques. BACE1-AS concentrations are elevated in subjects with Alzheimer's disease and in amyloid precursor protein transgenic mice.

Knocking down BACE1-AS reduces amyloid production and plaque deposition.

References

External links
 

Genes on human chromosome 11
RNA
Non-coding RNA
Alzheimer's disease